Sok may refer to:

As an acronym
 Søværnets Operative Kommando, the Danish Navy Operative Command
 Hok/sok system, in molecular biology
 Kamigawa, game expansion code
 South Kenton station, London, England (National Rail station code)
 Suomen Osuuskauppojen Keskuskunta, Finnish company 
 Swedish Olympic Committee

Other uses
Sok, a nickname for Australian cricketer Stephen O'Keefe
Sok (river), a tributary of the Volga in Russia